State Road 844 (SR 844), locally known as the Northeast 14th Street, is a , east–west street crossing the Intracoastal Waterway and connecting U.S. Route 1 (US 1) and State Road A1A in Pompano Beach, Broward County, Florida.

Route description

State Road 844 begins at US 1 in Pompano Beach, at the eastern end of the Pompano Beach Municipal Golf Course, with the Pompano Beach Airpark and Pompano Citi Centre nearby on US 1.  SR 844 heads east of US 1, passing through an area of apartment complexes and commercial buildings.  Two blocks from the eastern terminus of SR A1A, SR 844 crosses the Intracoastal Waterway and passes by more commercial buildings before ending at SR A1A, one block west of the beach.

Major intersections

References

External links

844
844
State highways in the United States shorter than one mile
Pompano Beach, Florida